Jeb Barton Terry, Jr. (born April 10, 1981) is a former American football guard. He was drafted by the Tampa Bay Buccaneers in the fifth round of the 2004 NFL Draft. He played college football at North Carolina.  He played for Culver Military Academy at the high school level.

Terry has also been a member of the San Francisco 49ers.

Terry is the CEO of Cosm, a technology company.

References

External links
North Carolina Tar Heels bio
San Francisco 49ers bio
Tampa Bay Buccaneers bio

1981 births
Living people
People from Dallas
American football offensive guards
North Carolina Tar Heels football players
Tampa Bay Buccaneers players
San Francisco 49ers players
Culver Academies alumni